This is a list of public artworks in the former Metropolitan Borough of St Marylebone in London, now a part of the City of Westminster.


Fitzrovia 

Part of Fitzrovia lies outside the City of Westminster; for works not listed here see the List of public art in the London Borough of Camden.

Fitzrovia, so named since the 1930s when it became a haunt for bohemians, is situated to the north of Soho and east of Marylebone. Its eastern part is in the London Borough of Camden.

Lisson Grove 

Lisson Grove, a residential area which urbanised as London expanded northwards in the 19th century, was designated a conservation area in 1990.

Marylebone 

Marylebone is an inner-city area roughly defined as being bounded by Oxford Street to the south, Marylebone Road to the north, Edgware Road to the west and Great Portland Street to the east. Portland Place, part of the grand route from Regent's Park to St James's planned by John Nash (who is commemorated by a bust outside All Souls, Langham Place), has historically been an attractive place for the erection of memorials because of its width.

Regent's Park 

Part of Regent's Park lies outside the City of Westminster; for works not listed here see the List of public art in Camden.

Regent's Park is one of London's Royal Parks, located partly in the London Borough of Camden and partly in the City of Westminster. The sculptures in Queen Mary's Gardens (laid out in the 1930s within the Inner Circle or Regent's Park) were bequeathed by the artist Sigismund Goetze, who lived nearby at Grove House from 1907 until his death in 1939. In 1944 his widow Constance Goetze established a trust fund in his memory, known as the Constance Fund, for the financing of new sculpture in London's parks.

London Zoo

Works no longer on public display

St John's Wood 

St John's Wood, a suburban area of mainly Victorian buildings in the northern extremity of the City of Westminster, was declared a conservation area in 1968.

References

Bibliography

 

 

 

 

 

 

Saint Marylebone